Ballygawley is a village in County Sligo, Ireland. The Ó Dálaigh family, referenced in the town's Irish name, were professional poets active in Ireland during the Middle Ages.

Sport
The hotel and golfcourse set around the ruins of the ancient castle Castle Dargan was opened in Ballygawley in 2005.

Places of interest
Ballygawley Mountains, a low mountain range which is an extension of the Ox Mountains include hills called Calliach a' Bhéara, Sliabh Deane, Sliabh Dargan and Aghamore Far. All these four have cairns at their summits. The hills are composed of a metamorphic rock called psammitic paragneiss. Near to Calliach a' Bhéara is a monument consisting of three stones, known locally as The Thief, the Boy and the Cow (Cloch a' Ghadai).

Ballygawley village has two pubs and two shops. One is connected with a petrol station. It also has a hairdresser and a post office. On the outskirts of the village there are two hotels, one being Castle Dargan with a golf course and spa, and Markree Castle with an archery range and stables.

See also
 List of towns and villages in Ireland

References

External links
 Information on Ballygawley and environs (archived)

Towns and villages in County Sligo